Scott Garrett (March 16, 1966, Washington, D.C.) is an American drummer.  He is known as the drummer for Wired All Wrong and Coloursound, and as support drummer for J between 1997 and 2016. He was also temporary drummer at the last few shows of God Lives Underwater. Bands Garrett played with include Neverland, Pop's Cool Love, The Cult, The Mission UK and Dag Nasty.

Biography
Scott Garrett grew up in Takoma Park, Maryland. Before age 10 he began drumming under the tutelage of William Frank Reichenbach Sr. legendary jazz drummer for Charlie Byrd, the Stan Getz album Jazz Samba, and co-developer of the jazz-samba drumming style and American wave of Bossa Nova enthusiasm.

From Reichenbach's training and exposure to the drum style in the D.C. area Go-Go Scotts's approach to meter and rhythm developed.

Technique
In technical terms, "Go-go's essential beat is characterized by a syncopated, dotted rhythm that consists of a series of quarter and eighth notes (quarter, eighth, quarter, (space/held briefly), quarter, eighth, quarter)... which is underscored most dramatically by the bass drum and snare drum, and the hi-hat... [and] is ornamented by the other percussion instruments, especially by the conga drums, timbales, and hand-held cowbells.

Discography

With J
Albums
 Pyromania (July 24, 1997), Oricon Albums Chart Peak Position: #9
 Blood Muzik (December 27, 2001) #34
 Unstoppable Drive (November 27, 2002) #18
 Red Room (May 19, 2004) #24
 Glaring Sun (December 7, 2005) #39
 Urge (March 14, 2007) #39
 Ride (April 23, 2008) #36
 On Fire (March 21, 2012) #24
 Freedom No.9 (October 23, 2013) #31
 Eternal Flames (September 2, 2015) #15

EPs
 Igniter #081 (July 18, 2002)
 Crack Tracks (August 21, 2002) #28
 Go with the Devil -Crack Tracks II- (July 9, 2003) #26
 Stars From The Broken Night (August 5, 2009) #20
 Here Comes Nameless Sunrise (December 16, 2009) #36

Other work
Zilch; 3.2.1. (1998) – additional drums on "Electric Cucumber" and "Pose"

Neverland, Interscope

References

Living people
1966 births
Musicians from Washington, D.C.
People from Takoma Park, Maryland
Musicians from Maryland
God Lives Underwater members
The Cult members
The Mission (band) members
Dag Nasty members
20th-century American drummers
American male drummers